The National Library of Medicine (NLM) classification system is a library indexing system covering the fields of medicine and preclinical basic sciences. The NLM classification is patterned after the Library of Congress (LC) Classification system: alphabetical letters   denote broad subject categories which are subdivided by numbers. For example, QW 279 would indicate a book on an aspect of microbiology or immunology.

The one- or two-letter alphabetical codes in the NLM classification use a limited range of letters: only QS–QZ and W–WZ. This allows the NLM system to co-exist with the larger LC coding scheme as neither of these ranges are used in the LC system. There are, however, three pre-existing codes in the LC system which overlap with the NLM: Human Anatomy (QM), Microbiology (QR), and Medicine (R). To avoid further confusion, these three codes are not used in the NLM.

The headings for the individual schedules (letters or letter pairs) are given in brief form (e.g., QW - Microbiology and Immunology; WG - Cardiovascular System) and together they provide an outline of the subjects covered by the NLM classification. Headings are interpreted broadly and include the physiological system, the specialties connected with them, the regions of the body chiefly concerned and subordinate related fields. The NLM system is hierarchical, and within each schedule, division by organ usually has priority. Each main schedule, as well as some sub-sections, begins with a group of form numbers ranging generally from 1–49 which  classify materials by publication type, e.g., dictionaries, atlases, laboratory manuals, etc.

The main schedules QS-QZ, W-WY, and WZ (excluding the range WZ 220–270)  classify works published after 1913; the 19th century schedule is used for works published 1801–1913; and WZ 220-270 is used to provide century groupings for works published before 1801.

Overview of the NLM Classification categories

Preclinical Sciences
 QS Human Anatomy
 QT Physiology
 QU Biochemistry
 QV Pharmacology
 QW Microbiology & Immunology
 QX Parasitology
 QY Clinical Pathology
 QZ Pathology

Medicine and Related Subjects

 W  Health Professions
 WA Public Health
 WB Practice of Medicine
 WC Communicable Diseases
 WD Disorders of Systemic, Metabolic, or Environmental Origin, etc.
 WE Musculoskeletal System
 WF Respiratory System
 WG Cardiovascular System
 WH Hemic and Lymphatic Systems
 WI Digestive System
 WJ Urogenital System
 WK Endocrine System
 WL Nervous System
 WM Psychiatry
 WN Radiology. Diagnostic Imaging
 WO Surgery
 WP Gynecology
 WQ Obstetrics
 WR Dermatology
 WS Pediatrics
 WT Geriatrics. Chronic Disease
 WU Dentistry. Oral Surgery
 WV Otolaryngology
 WW Ophthalmology
 WX Hospitals & Other Health Facilities
 WY Nursing
 WZ History of Medicine
 19th Century Schedule

See also
Dewey Decimal Classification
Colon Classification
Library of Congress Classification
Universal Decimal Classification

References

Citations

Sources 

 

Medical classification
Knowledge representation
Library cataloging and classification